53rd parallel may refer to:

53rd parallel north, a circle of latitude in the Northern Hemisphere
53rd parallel south, a circle of latitude in the Southern Hemisphere